Lasha Macharashvili (born 13 November 1998) is a rugby union player who currently plays for Stade Montois in the Pro D2 and also plays internationally for Georgia U20 as a prop.

References

External links

1998 births
Living people
Rugby union players from Georgia (country)
Rugby union props
Rugby union players from Tbilisi